Parvigondolella is an extinct genus of Late Triassic (late Norian-earliest Rhaetian) conodonts. The most common species in the genus, Parvigondolella andrusovi, is used as an index fossil for part of the Sevatian substage of the Norian stage. Kozur & Mock, 1991 named two additional species, P. rhaetica and P. vrielyncki. Moix et al. (2007) later argued that "Misikella" rhaetica was a species of Parvigondolella. In order to prevent having two different species with the same name within the genus, they renamed Kozur & Mock (1991)'s P. rhaetica to P. prorhaetica. However, this would be unnecessary if "Misikella" rhaetica was not related to Parvigondolella. Parvigondolella is typically considered a direct descendant of Mockina/Epigondolella bidentata.

References 

Index fossils
Triassic conodonts
Conodont genera